The Kakshiyali River is a canal located in the Satkhira District of Bangladesh.

History
British engineer William Coxhall was in charge of digging this canal.

References

Rivers of Bangladesh
Rivers of Khulna Division